John Barton Miadich (born February 3, 1976) is an American former Major League Baseball (MLB) pitcher who played for the Anaheim Angels in 2001 and 2003.

Amateur career
Miadich played high school baseball for Lakeridge High School in Lake Oswego, Oregon.  Miadich attended the University of San Diego, where he played college baseball for the Toreros from 1995-1997. In 1997, he played collegiate summer baseball with the Cotuit Kettleers of the Cape Cod Baseball League where he was named a league all-star.

Professional career
He was drafted by the Colorado Rockies of Major League Baseball (MLB) in 1994, but did not sign a contract with the team. In 1997, he signed as a free agent with the Boston Red Sox and was later traded to the Arizona Diamondbacks. The Diamondbacks released him in 2000.

He subsequently signed contracts with the San Diego Padres, Texas Rangers, Florida Marlins, and Tampa Bay Devil Rays. In 2005, he signed with the Yomiuri Giants of the Nippon Professional Baseball (NPB).

See also
 List of Major League Baseball players named in the Mitchell Report

References

External links
, or Retrosheet, or Japanese Baseball, or Pura Pelota (Venezuelan Winter League)

1976 births
Living people
Albuquerque Isotopes players
American expatriate baseball players in Canada
American expatriate baseball players in Japan
Anaheim Angels players
Baseball players from California
Cotuit Kettleers players
Durham Bulls players
Edmonton Trappers players
El Paso Diablos players
Erie SeaWolves players
High Desert Mavericks players
Lakeridge High School alumni
Major League Baseball pitchers
Nippon Professional Baseball pitchers
Oklahoma RedHawks players
People from Torrance, California
Portland Beavers players
Salt Lake Stingers players
San Diego Toreros baseball players
Sarasota Red Sox players
Tiburones de La Guaira players
American expatriate baseball players in Venezuela
Trenton Thunder players
Venados de Mazatlán players
American expatriate baseball players in Mexico
Yomiuri Giants players